Branko Brnović (Cyrillic: Бранко Брновић; born 8 August 1967) is a Montenegrin manager and retired professional footballer who played as a defensive midfielder.

Club career
After making his professional debuts with local club Budućnost, Brnović signed with national giants Partizan in 1991, helping the latter club to back-to-back national championships, with the addition of two cups. In the 1992–93 season, as it won the league and lost the domestic cup to city rivals Red Star, he scored a career-best six goals (the team netted 103).

In 1994, Brnović moved abroad and joined RCD Espanyol in La Liga – then known as Español. A starter in four of his six seasons in Catalonia, he left after a poor individual campaign (only one game in the league), which ended with conquest of the Copa del Rey.

Brnović came out of retirement in 2006 to play one season for Montenegrin club Kom.

International career
Brnović represented Yugoslavia on 27 occasions, his debut coming on 20 September 1989 in a 3–0 friendly win with Greece in Novi Sad. He also appeared during the UEFA Euro 1992 qualifying stage as the nation made it all the way to Sweden. He was included to the final tournament, but the team would be suspended due to the Yugoslav Wars.

Subsequently, Brnović was selected for the 1998 FIFA World Cup in France and appearing in three games in an eventual round-of-16 exit. Additionally, he was a member of the talented Yugoslav under-20 team that won the 1987 FIFA World Youth Championship in Chile, playing five matches in the tournament.

On 5 March 2007, Brnović was appointed assistant manager of Montenegro. On 8 September 2011 he became head coach after Zlatko Kranjčar was sacked, leading the side to the Euro 2012 playoffs, where they lost 0–3 on aggregate to the Czech Republic.

On 17 December 2015, it was announced that Brnović's contract, due to expire at the end of the year, would not be renewed.

Coaching statistics

References

External links

 
 
 National team data 
 

1967 births
Living people
Footballers from Podgorica
Association football midfielders
Yugoslav footballers
Yugoslavia international footballers
Serbia and Montenegro footballers
Serbia and Montenegro international footballers
Montenegrin footballers
1998 FIFA World Cup players
FK Budućnost Podgorica players
FK Partizan players
RCD Espanyol footballers
FK Kom players
Yugoslav First League players
La Liga players
Montenegrin First League players
Serbia and Montenegro expatriate footballers
Expatriate footballers in Spain
Serbia and Montenegro expatriate sportspeople in Spain
Montenegrin football managers
Montenegro national football team managers
FK Budućnost Podgorica managers